William Clement Frawley (February 26, 1887 – March 3, 1966) was an American vaudevillian and actor best remembered for playing landlord Fred Mertz in the American television sitcom I Love Lucy, "Bub" O'Casey in the television comedy series My Three Sons, and the political advisor to the judge character in the film Miracle on 34th Street.

Frawley began his career in vaudeville in 1914 with his wife, Edna Louise Broedt. Their comedy act, "Frawley and Louise", continued until their divorce in 1927. He performed on Broadway multiple times. In 1916, he signed with Paramount Studios and appeared in more than 100 films over the next 35 years.

Early life
Frawley was born in Burlington, Iowa, the second son of four children of Michael A. Frawley (1857–1907) and Mary E. (Brady) Frawley (1859–1921). He attended Catholic schools and sang in the choir at St. Paul's Catholic Church. As he got older, he played small roles in local theater productions at the Burlington Opera House, and performed in amateur shows, though his mother, a highly religious woman, discouraged such activities.

Frawley's first job was as a stenographer in an office of the Union Pacific Railroad in Omaha, Nebraska. Two years later, he moved to Chicago, where he found work as a court reporter, and against his mother's wishes, got a singing part in a musical comedy, The Flirting Princess. To appease his mother, he relocated to St. Louis, Missouri, to work for another railroad company.

Feeling unfulfilled in that job, as well, he continued to dream of being a professional entertainer. He finally formed a vaudeville act with his brother Paul (1889–1973), but six months later, their mother told Paul to return to Iowa. Meanwhile, William wrote a script titled Fun in a Vaudeville Agency, and sold it for over $500.

After his initial success as a scriptwriter, Frawley decided to move to the West, settling in Denver, where he was hired as a singer at a café and teamed with pianist Franz Rath. The duo soon moved to San Francisco with their act, "A Man, a Piano, and a Nut". During his vaudeville career, Frawley introduced and helped popularize the songs "My Mammy", "My Melancholy Baby", and "Carolina in the Morning". Many years later, in 1958, he recorded a selection of his old stage songs on an LP, Bill Frawley Sings the Old Ones.

Early career

Frawley began performing in Broadway theater. His first such show was the musical comedy, Merry, Merry in 1925. He had his first dramatic role in 1932, playing press agent Owen O'Malley in the original production of Ben Hecht and Charles MacArthur's Twentieth Century. He continued to be a dramatic actor at various venues until 1933.

In 1916, he had appeared in two short subject silent films. He subsequently performed in three more, but did not decide to develop a cinematic career until 1933, when he appeared in some short comedy films and the feature musical Moonlight and Pretzels (Universal Studios, 1933). He moved to Los Angeles, where he signed a seven-year contract with Paramount Pictures.

Finding much work as a character actor, he had roles in comedies, dramas, musicals, Westerns, and romances. He appeared in Miracle on 34th Street (1947) as Judge Harper's political adviser, who warns his client in great detail of the dire political consequences if he rules that there is no Santa Claus. Some of his other memorable film roles were the baseball manager in Joe E. Brown's Alibi Ike (1935), the wedding host in Charlie Chaplin's Monsieur Verdoux (1947), and a hard-nosed insurance investigator in My Home in San Antone with Roy Acuff and Lloyd Corrigan.

Television

I Love Lucy

By 1951, the 64-year-old Frawley had appeared in over 100 movies, but was starting to find film role offers becoming fewer. When he heard that Desi Arnaz and Lucille Ball were casting a new television situation comedy, he applied eagerly to play the role of the cantankerous, miserly landlord Fred Mertz. One evening, he telephoned Lucille Ball, asking her what his chances were. Ball was surprised to hear from him, a man she barely knew. Both Ball and Arnaz agreed it would be great to have Frawley, a motion-picture veteran, appear as Fred Mertz. Less enthusiastic were CBS executives, who were wary  of Frawley's well-known frequent drinking and instability. Arnaz warned Frawley about the network's concerns, telling him that if he was late to work, arrived drunk, or was unable to perform because of something other than legitimate illness more than once, he would be written out of the show. In one version of this conversation, Arnaz told Frawley he would get three chances. The first screw-up would be tolerated, the second would result in a severe reprimand, and the third would result in his being fired. Contrary to the network's concerns, Frawley never arrived at work drunk, and mastered his lines after only one reading. Arnaz eventually became one of Frawley's few close friends.

Before each episode, Frawley would read the script with the rest of the cast, then would take out the sheets with only his lines and discard the rest of the script to study only his part.

I Love Lucy debuted October 15, 1951, on CBS, and was a huge success. The series was broadcast for six years as half-hour episodes, later changing to hour-long specials from 1957 to 1960 titled The Lucille Ball-Desi Arnaz Show (later retitled The Lucy-Desi Comedy Hour).

Vivian Vance played Ethel Mertz, Frawley's on-screen wife. Although the two actors worked well together, they greatly disliked each other. Most attribute their mutual hatred to Vance's vocal resentment of having to play wife to a man 22 years her senior. Frawley reportedly overheard Vance complaining; he took offense and never forgave her. "She's one of the finest girls to come out of Kansas", he once observed, "But I often wish she'd go back there."

An avid New York Yankees baseball fan, Frawley had it written into his I Love Lucy contract that he did not have to work during the World Series if the Yankees were playing. The Yankees were in every World Series during that time except for 1954 and 1959. He did not appear in two episodes of the show as a result.

For his work on the show, Frawley was Emmy-nominated five consecutive times (1953–1957) for Outstanding Supporting Actor in a comedy series. In 1957, at the end of I Love Lucy, Ball and Arnaz gave Frawley and Vance the opportunity to have their own Fred and Ethel spin-off series for Desilu Studios. Despite his animosity towards her, Frawley saw a lucrative opportunity and accepted. Vance declined, having no desire to work with Frawley again and also feeling that Ethel and Fred would be unsuccessful without the Ricardos.

My Three Sons

Frawley next joined the cast of the ABC (later CBS) situation comedy My Three Sons, playing live-in grandfather and housekeeper Michael Francis (sometimes, as in "What's Cooking?", William Francis), then "Bub" O'Casey beginning in 1960. Featuring Fred MacMurray, the series was about a widower raising his three sons.

Frawley reportedly never felt comfortable with the out-of-sequence filming method used for My Three Sons after doing I Love Lucy in sequence for years. Each season was arranged so that main actor Fred MacMurray could film all of his scenes during two separate intensive blocks of filming for a total of 65 working days on the set; Frawley and the other actors worked around the absent MacMurray for the remainder of the year's production schedule.

Personal life
In 1914, Frawley married fellow vaudevillian Edna Louise Bloedt. They developed an act, "Frawley and Louise", which they performed all across the country. Their act was described as "light comedy, with singing, dancing, and patter." The couple separated in 1921 (later divorcing in 1927). They had no children. His brother Paul Frawley (1889–1973) also was an actor on Broadway with relatively few appearances in motion pictures.

Frawley had a reputation for being cantankerous and difficult, likely exacerbated by a drinking problem. In 1928, he was fired from the Broadway show That's My Baby for punching actor Clifton Webb in the nose.

Final years and death
Frawley made two television appearances the year before his death. His appearance on the panel show I've Got a Secret on May 3, 1965, consisted of contestants guessing Frawley's "secret", which was that he was the first performer ever to sing "My Melancholy Baby", in 1912. He had performed that song previously on television, as Fred Mertz, in the 1958 episode "Lucy Goes to Sun Valley" on the Lucy-Desi Comedy Hour.

Frawley's final on-camera performance was on October 25, 1965, with a brief cameo appearance in Lucille Ball's second television sitcom, The Lucy Show, in the episode "Lucy and the Countess Have a Horse Guest". Frawley plays a horse trainer and Lucy comments: "You know, he reminds me of someone I used to know." (Vivian Vance, who by then had left The Lucy Show except for an occasional guest appearance, does not appear in the episode.)

Frawley suffered a fatal heart attack while walking on Hollywood Boulevard and died on March 3, 1966, five days after his 79th birthday. Upon learning of his death, Desi Arnaz immediately took out a full-page ad in all the trade papers, with the words: "Buenas noches, amigo." Arnaz, Fred MacMurray, and My Three Sons executive producer Don Fedderson were pallbearers at his funeral. Lucille Ball said: "I've lost one of my dearest friends and show business has lost one of the greatest character actors of all time. Those of us who knew him and loved him will miss him."

Legacy
William Frawley is buried in the San Fernando Mission Cemetery in Mission Hills, Los Angeles. For his achievements in the field of motion pictures, he was awarded a star on the Hollywood Walk of Fame, at 6322 Hollywood Blvd, on February 8, 1960. He is memorialized, as well, in the Lucille Ball-Desi Arnaz Center in Jamestown, New York, which also contains his "Hippity-Hoppity" (frog) costume from an episode of I Love Lucy. Both Frawley and Vivian Vance were inducted into the Television Academy Hall of Fame in March 2012.

The story of how Desi Arnaz hired Frawley to play Fred Mertz in I Love Lucy is told in I Love Lucy: A Funny Thing Happened on the Way to the Sitcom, a stage comedy that had its world premiere in Los Angeles on July, 12, 2018. The play, from Gregg Oppenheimer (son of I Love Lucy creator-producer-head writer Jess Oppenheimer), was recorded in front of a live audience for nationwide public radio broadcast and online distribution, and starred Sarah Drew as Lucille Ball and Oscar Nunez as Desi Arnaz. BBC Radio 4 broadcast a serialized version of the play in the UK in August 2020, as Lucy Loves Desi: A Funny Thing Happened on the Way to the Sitcom, in which Stacy Keach portrayed Frawley, Anne Heche played Lucille Ball, and Wilmer Valderrama played Desi Arnaz.

Frawley was portrayed by John Wheeler in the television movie Lucy & Desi: Before the Laughter. Thirty years later he was portrayed in the 2021 film Being the Ricardos by J. K. Simmons, who received an Academy Award nomination for his role.

Filmography

 Lord Loveland Discovers America (1916) as Tony Kidd
 Persistent Percival (1916, Short) as Billy
 Should Husbands Be Watched? (1925, Short) as Beat Cop
 Ventriloquist (1927, short subject listed in BFI Database) as 'Hoak' salesman
 Turkey for Two (1929, Short) as Convict
 Fancy That (1929, Short) as Percy
 Moonlight and Pretzels (1933) as Mac
 Hell and High Water (1933) as Milton J. Bunsey
 Miss Fane's Baby Is Stolen (1934) as Captain Murphy
 Bolero (1934) as Mike DeBaere
 The Crime Doctor (1934) as Fraser
 The Witching Hour (1934) as Jury foreman
 Shoot the Works (1934) as Larry Hale
 The Lemon Drop Kid (1934) as William Dunhill
 Here Is My Heart (1934) as James Smith
 Car 99 (1935) as Sergeant Barrel
 Hold 'Em Yale (1935) as Sunshine Joe
 Alibi Ike (1935) as Cap
 College Scandal (1935) as Chief of Police Magoun
 Welcome Home (1935) as Painless
 Harmony Lane (1935) as Edwin P. 'Ed' Christy
 It's a Great Life (1935) as Lt. McNulty
 Ship Cafe (1935) as Briney O'Brien
 Strike Me Pink (1936) as Mr. Copple
 Desire (1936) as Mr. Gibson
 F-Man (1936) as Detective Rogan
 The Princess Comes Across (1936) as Benton
 Three Cheers for Love (1936) as Milton Shakespeare
 The General Died at Dawn (1936) as Brighton
 Three Married Men (1936) as Bill Mullins
 Rose Bowl (1936) as Soapy Moreland
 High, Wide and Handsome (1937) as Mac
 Double or Nothing (1937) as John Pederson
 Something to Sing About (1937) as Hank Meyers
 Blossoms on Broadway (1937) as Frances X. Rush
 Mad About Music (1938) as Dusty Turner
 Professor Beware (1938) as Snoop Donlan
 Sons of the Legion (1938) as Uncle Willie Lee
 Touchdown, Army (1938) as Jack Heffernan
 Ambush (1939) as Inspector J.L. Weber
 St. Louis Blues (1939) as Maj. Martingale
 Persons in Hiding (1939) as Alec Inglis
 The Adventures of Huckleberry Finn (1939) as The 'Duke'
 Rose of Washington Square (1939) as Harry Long
 Ex-Champ (1939) as Mushy Harrington
 Grand Jury Secrets (1939) as Bright Eyes
 Night Work (1939) as Bruiser Brown
 Stop, Look and Love (1939) as Joe Haller
 The Farmer's Daughter (1940) as Scoop Trimble
 Opened by Mistake (1940) as Matt Kingsley
 Those Were the Days! (1940) as Prisoner (uncredited)
 Untamed (1940) as Les Woodbury
 Golden Gloves (1940) as Emory Balzar
 Rhythm on the River (1940) as Mr. Westlake
 The Quarterback (1940) as Coach
 One Night in the Tropics (1940) as Roscoe
 Dancing on a Dime (1940) as Mac
 Sandy Gets Her Man (1940) as Police Chief J. A. O'Hara
 Six Lessons from Madame La Zonga (1941) as Chauncey Beheegan
 Footsteps in the Dark (1941) as Hopkins
 Blondie in Society (1941) as Waldo Pincus
 The Bride Came C.O.D. (1941) as Sheriff McGee
 Cracked Nuts (1941) as James Mitchell
 Public Enemies (1941) as Bang
 Treat 'Em Rough (1942) as 'Hotfoot'
 Roxie Hart (1942) as O'Malley
 It Happened in Flatbush (1942) as Sam Sloan
 Give Out, Sisters (1942) as Harrison
 Wildcat (1942) as Oliver Westbrook
 Moonlight in Havana (1942) as Barney Crane
 Gentleman Jim (1942) as Billy Delaney
 We've Never Been Licked (1943) as Traveling Salesman
 Larceny with Music (1943) as Mike Simms
 Whistling in Brooklyn (1943) as Detective Ramsey
 The Fighting Seabees (1944) as Eddie Powers
 Going My Way (1944) as Max Dolan – the Publisher (uncredited)
 Minstrel Man (1944)
 Lake Placid Serenade (1944) as Jiggers
 Flame of Barbary Coast (1945) as 'Smooth' Wylie
 Hitchhike to Happiness (1945) as Sandy Hill
 Lady on a Train (1945) as Police Sergeant Christie
 Ziegfeld Follies (1946) as Martin ('A Sweepstakes Ticket')
 The Virginian (1946) as Honey Wiggen
 Rendezvous with Annie (1946) as Gen. Trent
 The Inner Circle (1946) as Det. Lt. Webb
 Crime Doctor's Man Hunt (1946) as Inspector Harry B. Manning
 Hit Parade of 1947 (1947) as Harry Holmes
 Monsieur Verdoux (1947) as Jean La Salle
 Miracle on 34th Street (1947) as Charlie Halloran
 I Wonder Who's Kissing Her Now (1947) as Jim Mason
 Mother Wore Tights (1947) as Mr. Schneider
 Down to Earth (1947) as Police Lieutenant
 Blondie's Anniversary (1947) as Sharkey, the Loan Shark
 My Wild Irish Rose (1947) as William Scanlon
 Texas, Brooklyn & Heaven (1948) as Agent
 The Babe Ruth Story (1948) as Jack Dunn
 Good Sam (1948) as Tom Moore
 Joe Palooka in Winner Take All (1948) as Knobby Walsh
 The Girl from Manhattan (1948) as Mr. Bernouti
 Chicken Every Sunday (1949) as George Kirby
 The Lone Wolf and His Lady (1949) as Inspector J.D. Crane
 Home in San Antone (1949) as O'Fleery
 Red Light (1949) as Hotel Clerk
 The Lady Takes a Sailor (1949) as Oliver Harker
 East Side, West Side (1949) as Bill the Bartender
 Blondie's Hero (1950) as Marty Greer
 Kill the Umpire (1950) as Jimmy O'Brien
 Kiss Tomorrow Goodbye (1950) as Byers
 Pretty Baby (1950) as Corcoran
 Abbott and Costello Meet the Invisible Man (1951) as Detective Roberts
 The Lemon Drop Kid (1951) as Gloomy Willie
 Rhubarb (1951) as Len Sickles
 Rancho Notorious (1952) as Baldy Gunder
 I Love Lucy (1953, unreleased feature) as Fred Mertz / Himself
 The Dirty Look (1954, Short)
 Better Football (1954, Short) as Himself
 Safe at Home! (1962) as Bill Turner

Selected television (actor)

 I Love Lucy (1951–1957)
 The Lucille Ball-Desi Arnaz Show (1957–1960)
 The Ford Show, Starring Tennessee Ernie Ford(December 5, 1957)
 My Three Sons (1960–1965)
 The Lucy Show (1965 cameo, one episode)

Broadway credits

 Merry, Merry (1925–1926)
 Bye, Bye, Bonnie (1927)
 She's My Baby (1928)
 Here's Howe (1928)
 Sons O' Guns (1929–1930)
 She Lived Next to the Firehouse (1931)
 Tell Her the Truth (1932)
 Twentieth Century (1932–1933)
 The Ghost Writer (1933)

Discography

Albums
 Bill Frawley Sings the Old Ones (1958) Dot DLP-3061

References

External links

 
 
 
 
 

1887 births
1966 deaths
American male film actors
American male musical theatre actors
American male television actors
American male silent film actors
Vaudeville performers
Dot Records artists
Male actors from Iowa
People from Burlington, Iowa
Burials at San Fernando Mission Cemetery
20th-century American male actors
Catholics from Iowa
20th-century American singers
20th-century American male singers